Syllepte abyssalis is a moth in the family Crambidae. It was described by Snellen in 1892. It is found in New Guinea, Indonesia (Java, Ambon Island) and Australia, where it has been recorded from Queensland.

The wings are either white or brown with a thin wiggly dark crossline and blotches at the base of the forewings.

References

Moths described in 1892
abyssalis
Moths of New Guinea
Moths of Indonesia
Moths of Australia